Darryl Dwayne Granberry  Jr. (born October 10, 1997), known professionally as PontiacMadeDDG or simply DDG, is an American rapper, singer-songwriter, and YouTuber. He started making videos in 2014, expanding his content with YouTube vlogs after graduating high-school in 2015 and attending Central Michigan University. He dropped out of college a year later to focus on his YouTube and music career. 

In 2018, he signed to Epic Records, and later in 2020, he founded his own record label, Zooted Music, with longtime managers Eric O'Connor and Dimitri Hurt. His hit single "Moonwalking in Calabasas" (featuring Blueface) has gained over 200 million streams. DDG debuted in his first boxing match against Nate Wyatt on June 12, where he defeated Wyatt in the 5th round by Unanimous Decision.

Early life 
Darryl Dwayne Granberry Jr. was born in Pontiac, Michigan. He attended International Tech Academy, where he was class valedictorian. After graduating from high school, Darryl enrolled at Central Michigan University, where he later dropped out for what he says was making $30,000 per month being a Youtuber. After dropping out of Central Michigan, Darryl moved to Hollywood, California to be a full-time entertainer.

Career 
DDG was interested in music at a young age. He made music as a child in the studio where his father was an audio engineer. His early music included a diss track to Lil Yachty, which was called, "Big Boat". DDG released two songs in 2016 entitled "Balenciagas" and "Free Parties", both produced by Zaytoven. He also teamed up with Famous Dex for a song entitled "Lettuce". The track was initially released on DDG's YouTube channel and had 500,000 views in 1 hour, causing WorldstarHipHop to contact DDG to allow them to exclusively release the video. On November 23, 2017, DDG released a single, "Givenchy", off his debut EP, Take Me Serious. "Givenchy" received over 25 million views on YouTube. Complex identified "Givenchy" as a song "Bout to Blow in 2018". On March 17, 2018, DDG released Take Me Serious. After the release of Lettuce, DDG was contacted by major record labels, and in June 2018 signed a record deal with Epic Records.

On June 1, 2018, DDG released the single "Arguments", which was certified Gold by the RIAA on April 15, 2020. On March 22, 2019, DDG released his second EP, Sorry 4 the Hold Up. DDG released a music video for the song "Hold Up" from the EP, featuring Queen Naija, and it received over 15 million views on YouTube. On September 20, 2019, DDG released "Push", the first single off his debut album, Valedictorian. DDG released the album on November 1, 2019.

On July 24, 2020, DDG released his single "Moonwalking in Calabasas", which later received two remixes, the first featuring Blueface and the second featuring YG. It became DDG's first song to enter the Billboard Hot 100, peaking at number 82. The song was certified platinum on June 3, 2021. DDG and record producer OG Parker released the single "Money Long" featuring 42 Dugg on February 26, 2021. DDG released a collaborative mixtape with OG Parker, Die 4 Respect on March 19, 2021. It peaked at number 61 on the Billboard 200. On June 16, 2021, DDG was fan-voted on the tenth spot for the 2021 XXL Freshman List.

On February 18, 2022, DDG released his single "Elon Musk," which featured American-rapper Gunna. According to an interview with Complex Music, the single was a nod to DDG's admiration for the multi-billionaire business magnate and entrepreneur Elon Musk, as well as their similar interests with space travel. According to Forbes,  DDG "was the first rapper to shoot a music video with NASA's Zero Gravity Training emulating a space mission.

In 2022, it was announced that DDG and Halle Bailey from Chloe X Halle were dating. In September 30, 2022 he released a second studio album called "Its Not Me Its You," with features from Gunna, NLE Choppa , Polo G , Kevin Gates , and Babyface Ray.

In 2022, it was announced that DDG made Forbes 2023 30 Under 30 for music.

Discography

Studio albums

Mixtapes

Extended plays

Singles

As lead artist

As featured artist

Other certified songs

Guest appearances

Boxing career

Amateur boxing record

Notes

References

1997 births
Living people
African-American male rappers
Rappers from Michigan
People from Pontiac, Michigan
Epic Records artists
American YouTubers
YouTube vloggers
YouTube boxers
21st-century African-American people
Central Michigan University alumni
Trap musicians
American contemporary R&B singers
American hip hop singers